Esmarkbreen is a glacier in Oscar II Land at Spitsbergen, Svalbard. It is named after geologist Jens Esmark. The glacier has a length of 15 kilometers, and debouches into the bay Ymerbukta at the northern side of Isfjorden.

References

Glaciers of Spitsbergen